Rafael Cotoner y de Oleza (1601 – 20 October 1663) was a Spanish knight of Aragon who served as 60th Grand Master of the Knights Hospitaller or, as it is already known by that time, the Order of Malta, from 5 June 1660 to his death on 20 October 1663 following the brief reign of Annet de Clermont-Gessant. After his death, he was succeeded as Grand Master by his brother, Nicolas Cotoner.

During Cotoner's reign, the Order of Malta sent troops to Candia, besieged by the Ottomans.

Reign as Grand Master

During his 3-year reign, the Order of Malta sent reinforcements to support Venetians besieged by the Ottomans in Candia (Candia eventually fell after a siege lasting more than two decades in September 1669, almost 6 years after Cotoner's death). To show their gratitude and appreciation, the Republic of Venice passed a decree allowing members of the Order to appear armed within the Republic's dominions, something which had never been granted to the Republic's subjects themselves.

It was during Raphael's tenure as Grand Master that the Italian Baroque artist Mattia Preti started work in Valletta's St. John's Co-Cathedral. He went on to decorate the cathedral's interior with paintings of John the Baptist.

References

External links
 Coins of Grandmaster Rafael Cotoner

Raphael
Grand Masters of the Knights Hospitaller
Knights of Malta
People from Mallorca
1601 births
1663 deaths
Burials at Saint John's Co-Cathedral